Onofrio Spencer Jeffrey Bruno, professionally known as Spencer Brown, is an American electronic dance music artist, producer, and DJ. He is best known for his albums, 'Illusion of Perfection' (2018) and 'Stream of Consciousness' (2020), and for his collaborations with deadmau5 and Above & Beyond.

While Brown’s music can mainly be classified as progressive house, his sound spans across a wide range of electronic music, including techno, trance, and deep house.

Early life and education
Brown was born in Los Gatos, CA. At the age of 2, he started drumming. Around age 12, he started DJing and producing his own music, motivated by his dislike of the music selection at school parties. His first gigs included teenage birthday parties, Bar/Bat Mizvahs, and middle school parties. He moved to Dallas, TX when he was 13, where his DJ business grew. When Brown was 14, he discovered progressive house music through Axwell, Eric Prydz, and later Avicii. He graduated with distinction in 2016 in Electrical & Computer Engineering with a minor in Computer Science from Duke University - Pratt School of Engineering.

Career
Brown got his first break when Avicii signed him to his label for his "Chalice EP" on LE7ELS in 2014. He made his live debut opening for Avicii at the Hollywood Bowl in 2013. Thereafter, he toured North America, opening for Avicii’s True Tour. After graduating from Duke University, his career picked pace, when he continued touring and releasing music with world-known DJs like Above & Beyond and deadmau5. In a few years, Brown saw support from some of dance music's biggest international acts, including Calvin Harris, Armin van Buuren, Avicii, Sasha, FISHER, and Pete Tong.

Brown released his debut studio album, presented in mixed format, titled 'Illusion of Perfection’ on May 11, 2018. His dislike of radio-edits inspired his decision to create a mixalbum. He released his second album, also presented in mixed format, called 'Stream of Consciousness' on January 31, 2020. Collaborators included label mates Ben Böhmer, Marsh, and Qrion. Both albums became number one on the iTunes Dance charts and presented Brown with international headline tours. In 2021, Spencer was signed by Sasha to his Last Night on Earth imprint and to Insomniac's newly established Factory 93 label imprint, further establishing his reputation in the global house and techno scene.

Personal life 
Brown is openly gay; he came out publicly in June 2020, although he had confided in friends six years earlier. Being in the closet had led to depression and illness which he credits the dance music community for helping him recover, “I’ve transformed from a self-hating, anxiety-ridden boy to a self-loving, grateful man. I’m learning to transform my OCD into something more productive—like perfecting my mixdowns and sound design. I’m discovering ways to pass on the support I found in the dance music community, and I’m finding so much to be thankful for.”

Discography

Studio albums

Singles / EPs
 Chalice / Double Down EP - 2014 
 Jaboom / Mirek EP - 2014 
 Taking My Time - 2016 
 Wannamaker - 2016
 Vernal EP - 2017 
 Embarcadero EP - 2017 
 Embarcadero EP (The Remixes) - 2017
 Downpour EP - 2017
 No Going Back (with ALPHA 9 aka ARTY) - 2018 
 Illusion of Perfection EP pt. 1 - 2018
 Illusion of Perfection EP pt. 2 - 2018 
 Illusion of Perfection EP pt. 3 - 2018 
 Windows 95 on Acid EP - 2018 
 Long Way From Home (with Above & Beyond) - 2018
 Star Allies (with Raito) - 2019 
 Sapporo EP (with Qrion) - 2019 
 Gatekeeper EP (with ilan Bluestone) - 2019 
 Womaa (with Wilt Claybourne) - 2020 
 Stream of Consciousness EP pt. 1 - 2020 
 Stream of Consciousness EP pt. 2 - 2020
 Phases (with Ben Böhmer) - 2020
 Ariel / Afterlife EP (with ALPHA 9) - 2020
 Spiderman on Ambien / Stairs - 2020
 Santorini (with Tony McGuinness from Above & Beyond - single from Anjunadeep Explorations 17) - 2021
 Thanks, Guy - 2021
 I Was Too Young For 90s Raves EP - 2021
 Forbidden Flow / 18 Minute Loop - 2022

Remixes
 Henrik B, Niklas Gustavsson, Peter Johansson - Echoes (Spencer Brown Remix) - 2013 
 Boom Jinx & Meredith Call - The Dark (Spencer Brown Remix) - 2014
 Lazy Rich & Special Features - Beginning Of The World (Spencer Brown Remix) - 2014 
 Oliver Smith - On The Moon (Spencer Brown Remix) - 2017 
 ilan Bluestone ft. Giuseppe De Luca - Frozen Ground (Spencer Brown Remix) - 2017
 Andrew Rayel - Moments (Spencer Brown's Hypnotic Mix) - 2017 
 Seven Lions, Jason Ross, Paul Meany - Higher Love (Spencer Brown Remix) - 2017
 Spencer Brown - 5th & Concord (Spencer Brown Club Mix) - 2017 
 Above & Beyond ft. Richard Bedford - Northern Soul (Spencer Brown Remix) - 2017 
 ilan Bluestone - Will We Remain (Spencer Brown Remix) - 2018 
 Gryffin ft. Elley Duhé - Tie Me Down (Spencer Brown's Ibiza Mix) - 2018 
 Qrion - 23 (Spencer Brown Remix) - 2019 
 deadmau5 - fn pig (ov) [Spencer Brown Remix] - 2019 
 Above & Beyond - Sun In Your Eyes (Spencer Brown Remix) - 2021 
 Jody Wisternoff, Mimi Page - For Those We Knew (Spencer Brown & Wilt Claybourne Mix) - 2020
 Above & Beyond - Sun In Your Eyes (Spencer Brown Mix) - 2021
 dubspeeka - Geb (Spencer Brown Rework) - 2021

References

1994 births
Living people
Musicians from California
American electronic musicians
American gay musicians
People from Los Gatos, California
Duke University Pratt School of Engineering alumni
20th-century American LGBT people
21st-century LGBT people